Concobhar Ó Duibheannaigh (c. 1532 – 1 (O.S.)/11 (N.S.) February 1612; Conor O'Devany, Cornelius O'Devany) is a formally beatified Irish Catholic Martyrs who was an Irish Roman Catholic bishop and martyr.

Conor O'Devany was born in Malin Head, County Donegal, educated at the Franciscan convent in Donegal Town.  While in Rome, Ó Duibheannaigh was appointed Bishop of Down and Connor by Pope Gregory XIII on 27 April 1582, and consecrated by Cardinal Nicolas de Pellevé on 2 February 1583.

Execution and martyrdom
In 1588, Ó Duibheannaigh was committed to Dublin Castle. Failing to convict him of any crime punishable by death, Lord Deputy William Fitzwilliam sought authority from William Cecil, 1st Baron Burghley to "be rid of such an obstinate enemy of God and so rank a traitor to Her Majesty as no doubt he is". He lay in prison until November 1590, being then released ostensibly on his own petition but doubtless through policy. He was protected by Hugh O'Neill, Earl of Tyrone until 1607 (see the Flight of the Earls), and escaped arrest until the middle of 1611, when, almost eighty years old, he was taken while administering Confirmation and again committed to Dublin Castle. His execution was at the personal wish of the Lord Deputy of Ireland, Sir Arthur Chichester, who was vehemently anti-Catholic, and seems to have been rather against the wishes of the Government as a whole.

On 28 January 1612, Ó Duibheannaigh was tried for high treason, found guilty by the majority of a packed jury, and sentenced to die on 1 February (Julian Calendar). He was drawn on a cart from the Castle to the gallows beyond the river; the whole route was crowded with Catholics. Protestant clergymen pestered him with ministrations and urged him to confess he died for treason. "Pray let me be", he answered, "the viceroy's messenger to me here present, could tell that I might have life and revenue for going once to that temple", pointing to a tower opposite. He kissed the gallows before mounting, and then proceeding to exhort the Catholics to constancy, he was thrown off, cut down alive, and quartered.

With him suffered Patrick O'Loughran, a priest arrested at Cork. The people, despite the guards, carried off the halter, his clothes, and even fragments of his body and chips of the gallows. They prayed all night by the remains, an infirm man was reported cured by touching them, and Mass after Mass was said there from Midnight until day. Such was the concourse that the viceroy ordered the members to be buried on the spot, but next night the Catholics exhumed them and interred them in St. James's Churchyard. A list of martyrs compiled by Ó Duibheannaigh was used by Rothe in his "Analecta".

Beatification
On 27 September 1992, Ó Duibheannaigh, with sixteen others, the Irish Catholic Martyrs, was beatified by Pope John Paul II in Rome. The Feast Day of the Irish Martyrs is celebrated on 20 June.

See also
Irish Catholic Martyrs

References

Bibliography

Further reading
 
O'Laverty, Diocese of Down and Connor, V (Dublin, 1895)
Rothe, Analecta Nova et Mira, ed. Moran (Dublin, 1884)
O'Reilly, Myles Memorials of those who Suffered for the Catholic Faith in Ireland (London, 1868)
Denis Murphy, Our Martyrs (Dublin: Fallon, 1896)

1530s births
1612 deaths
Roman Catholic bishops of Down and Connor
16th-century Roman Catholic bishops in Ireland
People from Raphoe
Irish beatified people
People executed by Ireland by hanging, drawing and quartering
Executed Irish people
People executed for treason against Ireland
17th-century Roman Catholic bishops in Ireland
17th-century Roman Catholic martyrs
17th-century venerated Christians
People of Elizabethan Ireland
Irish Franciscans
People from County Donegal
17th-century executions by Ireland
Beatifications by Pope John Paul II
24 Irish Catholic Martyrs